Halit Karsıalan, commonly known as "Deli" Halid Pasha (1883 in Beshiktaș, Istanbul, Ottoman Empire – 1925) was a Turkish officer and politician.

After graduating from Military School in 1903, he joined the Ottoman Army as a lieutenant. He took his place in several military campaigns, starting from Yemen in 1908, Trablusgarp in 1910 and the Balkan Wars (1912-1913). Halit Bey was appointed to the Caucasus Front during the First World War. He led successful campaigns in Kars, Sarikamis and Ardahan, however the Ottomans lost the war. 

After the World War, Halit Bey joined Mustafa Kemal Ataturk for the Turkish Independence War. In the beginning, he served in the Eastern Front, but after the Gumru Agreement, he was sent to the Western Front. Due to his daringness and courage in the battlefield, he was nicknamed "Mad" (Deli). After the war, he was honored with the War of Independence Medal.

Halit Bey became Ardahan Deputy in the Turkish Grand National Assembly. However, he was shot on 9th February 1925 and died on 14th February. It was alleged that Ali Çetinkaya had shot him in the Turkish Parliament but the murder was not prosecuted since attorneys claimed that it was self-defence.

See also
List of high-ranking commanders of the Turkish War of Independence

References

External links

1883 births
1925 deaths
Military personnel from Istanbul
Ottoman Military Academy alumni
Ottoman Army officers
Ottoman military personnel of the Balkan Wars
Members of the Special Organization (Ottoman Empire)
Ottoman military personnel of World War I
Armenian genocide perpetrators
Turkish military personnel of the Turkish–Armenian War
Turkish military personnel of the Greco-Turkish War (1919–1922)
Recipients of the Medal of Independence with Red Ribbon (Turkey)
Turkish Army generals
Deputies of Ardahan
Deaths by firearm in Turkey
Members of the 2nd Parliament of Turkey